Pierre Robin may refer to:
 Pierre Robin (designer), French aeroplane designer
 Pierre Robin (surgeon) (1867–1950), French surgeon
Pierre Robin syndrome, a congenital condition of facial abnormalities
Pierre Robin (judoka), French judoka